The Information Age (also known as the Computer Age, Digital Age, Silicon Age, or New Media Age) is a historical period that began in the mid-20th century. It is characterized by a rapid shift from traditional industries, as established during the Industrial Revolution, to an economy centered on information technology. The onset of the Information Age has been linked to the development of the transistor in 1947, the optical amplifier in 1957, and Unix time, which began on January 1, 1970, and serves as the basis for Coordinated Universal Time and the Network Time Protocol. These technological advances have had a significant impact on the way information is processed and transmitted.

According to the United Nations Public Administration Network, the Information Age was formed by capitalizing on computer microminiaturization advances, which led to modernized information systems and internet communications as the driving force of social evolution.

Overview of early developments

Library expansion and Moore's law
Library expansion was calculated in 1945 by Fremont Rider to double in capacity every 16 years where sufficient space made available. He advocated replacing bulky, decaying printed works with miniaturized microform analog photographs, which could be duplicated on-demand for library patrons and other institutions.

Rider did not foresee, however, the digital technology that would follow decades later to replace analog microform with digital imaging, storage, and transmission media, whereby vast increases in the rapidity of information growth would be made possible through automated, potentially-lossless digital technologies. Accordingly, Moore's law, formulated around 1965, would calculate that the number of transistors in a dense integrated circuit doubles approximately every two years.

By the early 1980s, along with improvements in computing power, the proliferation of the smaller and less expensive personal computers allowed for immediate access to information and the ability to share and store it. Connectivity between computers within organizations enabled access to greater amounts of information.

Information storage and Kryder's law

 The world's technological capacity to store information grew from 2.6 (optimally compressed) exabytes (EB) in 1986 to 15.8 EB in 1993; over 54.5 EB in 2000; and to 295 (optimally compressed) EB in 2007. This is the informational equivalent to less than one 730-megabyte (MB) CD-ROM per person in 1986 (539 MB per person); roughly four CD-ROM per person in 1993; twelve CD-ROM per person in the year 2000; and almost sixty-one CD-ROM per person in 2007. It is estimated that the world's capacity to store information has reached 5 zettabytes in 2014, the informational equivalent of 4,500 stacks of printed books from the earth to the sun.

The amount of digital data stored appears to be growing approximately exponentially, reminiscent of Moore's law. As such, Kryder's law prescribes that the amount of storage space available appears to be growing approximately exponentially.

Information transmission
The world's technological capacity to receive information through one-way broadcast networks was 432 exabytes of (optimally compressed) information in 1986; 715 (optimally compressed) exabytes in 1993; 1.2 (optimally compressed) zettabytes in 2000; and 1.9 zettabytes in 2007, the information equivalent of 174 newspapers per person per day.

The world's effective capacity to exchange information through two-way telecommunication networks was 281 petabytes of (optimally compressed) information in 1986; 471 petabytes in 1993; 2.2 (optimally compressed) exabytes in 2000; and 65 (optimally compressed) exabytes in 2007, the information equivalent of 6 newspapers per person per day. In the 1990s, the spread of the Internet caused a sudden leap in access to and ability to share information in businesses and homes globally. A computer that cost $3000 in 1997 would cost $2000 two years later and $1000 the following year, due to the rapid advancement of technology.

Computation
The world's technological capacity to compute information with humanly guided general-purpose computers grew from 3.0 × 108 MIPS in 1986, to 4.4 × 109 MIPS in 1993; to 2.9 × 1011 MIPS in 2000; to 6.4 × 1012 MIPS in 2007. An article featured in the journal Trends in Ecology and Evolution in 2016 reported that:

Genetic information
Genetic code may also be considered part of the information revolution. Now that sequencing has been computerized, genome can be rendered and manipulated as data. This started with DNA sequencing, invented by Walter Gilbert and Allan Maxam in 1976-1977 and Frederick Sanger in 1977, grew steadily with the Human Genome Project, initially conceived by Gilbert and finally, the practical applications of sequencing, such as gene testing, after the discovery by Myriad Genetics of the BRCA1 breast cancer gene mutation. Sequence data in Genbank has grown from the 606 genome sequences registered in December 1982 to the 231 million genomes in August 2021. An additional 13 trillion incomplete sequences are registered in the Whole Genome Shotgun submission database as of August 2021. The information contained in these registered sequences has doubled every 18 months.

Different stage conceptualizations
During rare times in human history, there have been periods of innovation that have transformed human life. The Neolithic Age, the Scientific Age and the Industrial Age all, ultimately, induced discontinuous and irreversible changes in the economic, social and cultural elements of the daily life of most people. Traditionally, these epochs have taken place over hundreds, or in the case of the Neolithic Revolution, thousands of years, whereas the Information Age swept to all parts of the globe in just a few years. The reason for its rapid adoption is the rapidly advancing speed of information exchange.

Between 7,000 and 10,000 years ago during the Neolithic period, humans began to domesticate animals, began to farm grains and to replace stone tools with ones made of metal. These innovations allowed nomadic hunter-gatherers to settle down. Villages formed along the Yangtze River in China in 6,500 B.C., the Nile River region of Africa and in Mesopotamia (Iraq) in 6,000 B.C. Cities emerged between 6,000 B.C. and 3,500 B.C. The development of written communication (cuneiform in Sumeria and hieroglyphs in Egypt in 3,500 B.C. and writing in Egypt in 2,560 B.C. and in Minoa and China around 1,450 B.C.) enabled ideas to be preserved for extended periods to spread extensively. In all, Neolithic developments, augmented by writing as an information tool, laid the groundwork for the advent of civilization.

The Scientific Age began in the period between Galileo's 1543 proof that the planets orbit the sun and Newton's publication of the laws of motion and gravity in Principia in 1697. This age of discovery continued through the 18th century, accelerated by widespread use of the moveable type printing press by Johannes Gutenberg.

The Industrial Age began in Great Britain in 1760 and continued into the mid-19th century. It altered many aspects of life around the world. The invention of machines such as the mechanical textile weaver by Edmund Cartwrite, the rotating shaft steam engine by James Watt and the cotton gin by Eli Whitney, along with processes for mass manufacturing, came to serve the needs of a growing global population. The Industrial Age harnessed steam and waterpower to reduce the dependence on animal and human physical labor as the primary means of production. Thus, the core of the Industrial Revolution was the generation and distribution of energy from coal and water to produce steam and, later in the 20th century, electricity.

The Information Age also requires electricity to power the global networks of computers that process and store data. However, what dramatically accelerated the pace of adoption of The Information Age, as compared to previous ones, was the speed by which knowledge could be transferred and pervaded the entire human family in a few short decades. This acceleration came about with the adoptions of a new form of power. Beginning in 1972, engineers devised ways to harness light to convey data through fiber optic cable. Today, light-based optical networking systems at the heart of telecom networks and the Internet span the globe and carry most of the information traffic to and from users and data storage systems.

There are different conceptualizations of the Information Age. Some focus on the evolution of information over the ages, distinguishing between the Primary Information Age and the Secondary Information Age. Information in the Primary Information Age was handled by newspapers, radio and television. The Secondary Information Age was developed by the Internet, satellite televisions and mobile phones. The Tertiary Information Age was emerged by media of the Primary Information Age interconnected with media of the Secondary Information Age as presently experienced.

Others classify it in terms of the well-established Schumpeterian long waves or Kondratiev waves. Here authors distinguish three different long-term metaparadigms, each with different long waves. The first focused on the transformation of material, including stone, bronze, and iron. The second, often referred to as industrial revolution, was dedicated to the transformation of energy, including water, steam, electric, and combustion power. Finally, the most recent metaparadigm aims at transforming information. It started out with the proliferation of communication and stored data and has now entered the age of algorithms, which aims at creating automated processes to convert the existing information into actionable knowledge.

Economics
Eventually, Information and communication technology (ICT)—i.e. computers, computerized machinery, fiber optics, communication satellites, the Internet, and other ICT tools—became a significant part of the world economy, as the development of optical networking and microcomputers greatly changed many businesses and industries. Nicholas Negroponte captured the essence of these changes in his 1995 book, Being Digital, in which he discusses the similarities and differences between products made of atoms and products made of bits.

Jobs and income distribution
The Information Age has affected the workforce in several ways, such as compelling workers to compete in a global job market. One of the most evident concerns is the replacement of human labor by computers that can do their jobs faster and more effectively, thus creating a situation in which individuals who perform tasks that can easily be automated are forced to find employment where their labor is not as disposable. This especially creates issue for those in industrial cities, where solutions typically involve lowering working time, which is often highly resisted. Thus, individuals who lose their jobs may be pressed to move up into joining "mind workers" (e.g. engineers, doctors, lawyers, teachers, professors, scientists, executives, journalists, consultants), who are able to compete successfully in the world market and receive (relatively) high wages.

Along with automation, jobs traditionally associated with the middle class (e.g. assembly line, data processing, management, and supervision) have also begun to disappear as result of outsourcing. Unable to compete with those in developing countries, production and service workers in post-industrial (i.e. developed) societies either lose their jobs through outsourcing, accept wage cuts, or settle for low-skill, low-wage service jobs. In the past, the economic fate of individuals would be tied to that of their nation's. For example, workers in the United States were once well paid in comparison to those in other countries. With the advent of the Information Age and improvements in communication, this is no longer the case, as workers must now compete in a global job market, whereby wages are less dependent on the success or failure of individual economies.

In effectuating a globalized workforce, the internet has just as well allowed for increased opportunity in developing countries, making it possible for workers in such places to provide in-person services, therefore competing directly with their counterparts in other nations. This competitive advantage translates into increased opportunities and higher wages.

Automation, productivity, and job gain
The Information Age has affected the workforce in that automation and computerization have resulted in higher productivity coupled with net job loss in manufacturing. In the United States, for example, from January 1972 to August 2010, the number of people employed in manufacturing jobs fell from 17,500,000 to 11,500,000 while manufacturing value rose 270%.
Although it initially appeared that job loss in the industrial sector might be partially offset by the rapid growth of jobs in information technology, the recession of March 2001 foreshadowed a sharp drop in the number of jobs in the sector. This pattern of decrease in jobs would continue until 2003, and data has shown that, overall, technology creates more jobs than it destroys even in the short run.

Information-intensive industry

Industry has become more information-intensive while less labor- and capital-intensive. This has left important implications for the workforce, as workers have become increasingly productive as the value of their labor decreases. For the system of capitalism itself, the value of labor decreases, the value of capital increases.

In the classical model, investments in human and financial capital are important predictors of the performance of a new venture. However, as demonstrated by Mark Zuckerberg and Facebook, it now seems possible for a group of relatively inexperienced people with limited capital to succeed on a large scale.

Innovations

The Information Age was enabled by technology developed in the Digital Revolution, which was itself enabled by building on the developments of the Technological Revolution.

Transistors

The onset of the Information Age can be associated with the development of transistor technology. The concept of a field-effect transistor was first theorized by Julius Edgar Lilienfeld in 1925. The first practical transistor was the point-contact transistor, invented by the engineers Walter Houser Brattain and John Bardeen while working for William Shockley at Bell Labs in 1947. This was a breakthrough that laid the foundations for modern technology. Shockley's research team also invented the bipolar junction transistor in 1952. The most widely used type of transistor is the metal–oxide–semiconductor field-effect transistor (MOSFET), invented by Mohamed M. Atalla and Dawon Kahng at Bell Labs in 1960. The complementary MOS (CMOS) fabrication process was developed by Frank Wanlass and Chih-Tang Sah in 1963.

Computers

Before the advent of electronics, mechanical computers, like the Analytical Engine in 1837, were designed to provide routine mathematical calculation and simple decision-making capabilities. Military needs during World War II drove development of the first electronic computers, based on vacuum tubes, including the Z3, the Atanasoff–Berry Computer, Colossus computer, and ENIAC.

The invention of the transistor enabled the era of mainframe computers (1950s–1970s), typified by the IBM 360. These large, room-sized computers provided data calculation and manipulation that was much faster than humanly possible, but were expensive to buy and maintain, so were initially limited to a few scientific institutions, large corporations, and government agencies.

The germanium integrated circuit (IC) was invented by Jack Kilby at Texas Instruments in 1958. The silicon integrated circuit was then invented in 1959 by Robert Noyce at Fairchild Semiconductor, using the planar process developed by Jean Hoerni, who was in turn building on Mohamed Atalla's silicon surface passivation method developed at Bell Labs in 1957. Following the invention of the MOS transistor by Mohamed Atalla and Dawon Kahng at Bell Labs in 1959, the MOS integrated circuit was developed by Fred Heiman and Steven Hofstein at RCA in 1962. The silicon-gate MOS IC was later developed by Federico Faggin at Fairchild Semiconductor in 1968. With the advent of the MOS transistor and the MOS IC, transistor technology rapidly improved, and the ratio of computing power to size increased dramatically, giving direct access to computers to ever smaller groups of people.

The first commercial single-chip microprocessor launched in 1971, the Intel 4004, which was developed by Federico Faggin using his silicon-gate MOS IC technology, along with Marcian Hoff, Masatoshi Shima and Stan Mazor.

Along with electronic arcade machines and home video game consoles pioneered by Nolan Bushnell in the 1970s, the development of personal computers like the Commodore PET and Apple II (both in 1977) gave individuals access to the computer. But data sharing between individual computers was either non-existent or largely manual, at first using punched cards and magnetic tape, and later floppy disks.

Data

The first developments for storing data were initially based on photographs, starting with microphotography in 1851 and then microform in the 1920s, with the ability to store documents on film, making them much more compact. Early information theory and Hamming codes were developed about 1950, but awaited technical innovations in data transmission and storage to be put to full use.

Magnetic-core memory was developed from the research of Frederick W. Viehe in 1947 and An Wang at Harvard University in 1949. With the advent of the MOS transistor, MOS semiconductor memory was developed by John Schmidt at Fairchild Semiconductor in 1964. In 1967, Dawon Kahng and Simon Sze at Bell Labs described in 1967 how the floating gate of an MOS semiconductor device could be used for the cell of a reprogrammable ROM.  Following the invention of flash memory by Fujio Masuoka at Toshiba in 1980, Toshiba commercialized NAND flash memory in 1987.

Copper wire cables transmitting digital data connected computer terminals and peripherals to mainframes, and special message-sharing systems leading to email, were first developed in the 1960s. Independent computer-to-computer networking began with ARPANET in 1969. This expanded to become the Internet (coined in 1974). Access to the Internet improved with the invention of the World Wide Web in 1991. The capacity expansion from dense wave division multiplexing, optical amplification and optical networking in the mid-1990s led to record data transfer rates. By 2018, optical networks routinely delivered 30.4 terabits/s over a fiber optic pair, the data equivalent of 1.2 million simultaneous 4K HD video streams.

MOSFET scaling, the rapid miniaturization of MOSFETs at a rate predicted by Moore's law, led to computers becoming smaller and more powerful, to the point where they could be carried. During the 1980s1990s, laptops were developed as a form of portable computer, and personal digital assistants (PDAs) could be used while standing or walking. Pagers, widely used by the 1980s, were largely replaced by mobile phones beginning in the late 1990s, providing mobile networking features to some computers. Now commonplace, this technology is extended to digital cameras and other wearable devices. Starting in the late 1990s, tablets and then smartphones combined and extended these abilities of computing, mobility, and information sharing. Metal–oxide–semiconductor (MOS) image sensors, which first began appearing in the late 1960s, led to the transition from analog to digital imaging, and from analog to digital cameras, during the 1980s–1990s. The most common image sensors are the charge-coupled device (CCD) sensor and the CMOS (complementary MOS) active-pixel sensor (CMOS sensor).

Electronic paper, which has origins in the 1970s, allows digital information to appear as paper documents.

Personal computers

By 1976, there were several firms racing to introduce the first truly successful commercial personal computers. Three machines, the Apple II, PET 2001 and TRS-80 were all released in 1977, becoming the most popular by late 1978. Byte magazine later referred to Commodore, Apple, and Tandy as the "1977 Trinity". Also in 1977, Sord Computer Corporation released the Sord M200 Smart Home Computer in Japan.

Apple II 

Steve Wozniak (known as "Woz"), a regular visitor to Homebrew Computer Club meetings, designed the single-board Apple I computer and first demonstrated it there. With specifications in hand and an order for 100 machines at US$500 each from the Byte Shop, Woz and his friend Steve Jobs founded Apple Computer.

About 200 of the machines sold before the company announced the Apple II as a complete computer. It had color graphics, a full QWERTY keyboard, and internal slots for expansion, which were mounted in a high quality streamlined plastic case. The monitor and I/O devices were sold separately. The original Apple II operating system was only the built-in BASIC interpreter contained in ROM. Apple DOS was added to support the diskette drive; the last version was "Apple DOS 3.3".

Its higher price and lack of floating point BASIC, along with a lack of retail distribution sites, caused it to lag in sales behind the other Trinity machines until 1979, when it surpassed the PET. It was again pushed into 4th place when Atari introduced its popular Atari 8-bit systems.

Despite slow initial sales, the Apple II's lifetime was about eight years longer than other machines, and so accumulated the highest total sales.  By 1985 2.1 million had sold and more than 4 million Apple II's were shipped by the end of its production in 1993.

Optical networking 

Optical communication plays a crucial role in communication networks. Optical communication provides the transmission backbone for the telecommunications and computer networks that underlie the Internet, the foundation for the Digital Revolution and Information Age.

The two core technologies are the optical fiber and light amplification (the optical amplifier). In 1953, Bram van Heel demonstrated image transmission through bundles of optical fibers with a transparent cladding. The same year, Harold Hopkins and Narinder Singh Kapany at Imperial College succeeded in making image-transmitting bundles with over 10,000 optical fibers, and subsequently achieved image transmission through a 75 cm long bundle which combined several thousand fibers.

Gordon Gould invented the optical amplifier and the laser, and also established the first optical telecommunications company, Optelecom, to design communication systems. The firm was a co-founder in Ciena Corp., the venture that popularized the optical amplifier with the introduction of the first dense wave division multiplexing system. This massive scale communication technology has emerged as the common basis of all telecommunication networks and, thus, a foundation of the Information Age.

Economy, society and culture
Manuel Castells captures the significance of the Information Age in The Information Age: Economy, Society and Culture when he writes of our global interdependence and the new relationships between economy, state and society, what he calls "a new society-in-the-making." He cautions that just because humans have dominated the material world, does not mean that the Information Age is the end of history: "It is in fact, quite the opposite: history is just beginning, if by history we understand the moment when, after millennia of a prehistoric battle with Nature, first to survive, then to conquer it, our species has reached the level of knowledge and social organization that will allow us to live in a predominantly social world. It is the beginning of a new existence, and indeed the beginning of a new age, The Information Age, marked by the autonomy of culture vis-à-vis the material basis of our existence."

Thomas Chatterton Williams wrote about the dangers of anti-intellectualism in the Information Age in a piece for The Atlantic.  Although access to information has never been greater, most information is irrelevant or insubstantial.  The Information Age's emphasis on speed over expertise contributes to "superficial culture in which even the elite will openly disparage as pointless our main repositories for the very best that has been thought."

See also

 Attention economy
 Attention inequality
 Big data
 Cognitive-cultural economy
 Computer crime
 Cyberterrorism
 Cyberwarfare
 Datamation – first print magazine dedicated solely to covering information technology
 Digital dark age
 Digital detox
 Digital divide
 Digital transformation
 Digital world
 Imagination age, the hypothesized successor of the information age: a period in which creativity and imagination become the primary creators of economic value
 Indigo Era
 Information explosion
 Information revolution
 Information society
 Internet governance
 Netocracy
 Social Age
 Technological determinism
 Telecommunications
 Zettabyte Era
 The Hacker Ethic and the Spirit of the Information Age
 Information and communication technologies for environmental sustainability

References

Further reading
 Oliver Stengel et al. (2017). Digitalzeitalter - Digitalgesellschaft, Springer 
 Mendelson, Edward (June 2016). In the Depths of the Digital Age, The New York Review of Books
 Bollacker, Kurt D. (2010) Avoiding a Digital Dark Age, American Scientist, March–April 2010, Volume 98, Number 2, p. 106ff
 Castells, Manuel. (1996–98). The Information Age: Economy, Society and Culture, 3 vols. Oxford: Blackwell.
 Gelbstein, E. (2006) Crossing the Executive Digital Divide.

External links

 Articles on the impact of the Information Age on business – at Information Age magazine
 Beyond the Information Age by Dave Ulmer
 Information Age Anthology Vol I by Alberts and Papp (CCRP, 1997) (PDF)
 Information Age Anthology Vol II by Alberts and Papp (CCRP, 2000) (PDF)
 Information Age Anthology Vol III by Alberts and Papp (CCRP, 2001) (PDF)
 Understanding Information Age Warfare by Alberts et al. (CCRP, 2001) (PDF)
 Information Age Transformation by Alberts (CCRP, 2002) (PDF)
 The Unintended Consequences of Information Age Technologies by Alberts (CCRP, 1996) (PDF)
History & Discussion of the Information Age
 Science Museum - Information Age 

 
Digital media
Digital divide
Contemporary history
Historical eras
Postmodernism
Cultural trends
Western culture